Stefanos Paparounas (Greek: Στέφανος Παπαρούνας, born 22 January 1990 in Trikala) is a Greek diver. He competed in the 3 m springboard event at the 2012 Summer Olympics.

References

External links
FINA profile

1990 births
Greek male divers
Living people
Divers at the 2012 Summer Olympics
Olympic divers of Greece
Sportspeople from Trikala